Jean-Mandé Sigogne (6 April 1763 – 9 November 1844) was a French Catholic priest, who moved to Canada after the Revolution and became known for his missionary work among the Acadians and Mi'kmaw of Nova Scotia. A large number of Mi'kmaq visited him at Sainte-Marie Church and attended his services at regular intervals during the year. A bilingual Mi'kmaq-French catechism used by Sigogne has survived and is now held by the National Archives in Ottawa. He was known by Mi'kmaq as their Nujjinen, a term which means 'father', as he was to everyone who called upon his generosity.

Life 
The Acadians who had reestablished themselves in southwestern Nova Scotia in the wake of the Great Upheaval (1755–63) had, at the end of the 18th century, still not succeeded in finding a priest for their community. After many years of frustration, their wishes were granted when a priest was sent to them who was French, relatively young, courageous, prudent and determined. "I have had the good fortune to be able to confess the faith before the people and before the tribunals; and I have endured deprivation of all temporal goods, as well as the loss of my relations, my acquaintances, and my friends. Beyond this I have suffered exile for the faith: for which glory and thankfulness are ever due to God."

Sigogne had been ordained in France in 1787, and named vicar of Manthelan in the diocese of Tours. He worked there for four years before friction with the Republicans (which had become serious in the summer of 1790, and had prompted from Sigogne a sermon condemning the Revolution) forced him to leave the area secretly and move to London in summer 1792. "Indeed I lay now under a double obligation of gratitude to the benevolence of the English People. I had first experienced it, with many French Ecclesiastics, not without admiration, when the terrible and cruel revolution of France forced me to take refuge in England. And I do again on this melancholy occasion for the second time, with no less astonishment for its greatness and as much gratitude as being extended not only towards me, but towards our destitute folks."

Sigogne left England on April 14, 1799 and arrived in Halifax, Nova Scotia on June 12, 1799. From Halifax, he was taken to Yarmouth County in a fishing boat.

He worked with the Acadians and Mi'kmaw for over 45 years, as pastor, as builder of churches and schools, and as a defender of their civil rights. The two great parishes (St. Mary and St. Anne) were composed of scattered small villages linked only by crude paths through the forest, which were often impassable, particularly in winter. The villagers had large families and nearly all their efforts were expended in providing the necessities of life; moments of leisure were infrequent and centred on religious festivals, weddings, and funerals. Their trade and barter with the Caribbean resulted in a continuous influx of alcoholic drink. Sigogne struggled to promote Christian principles among this scattered population, but his efforts were not in vain and were much appreciated by his parishioners.

In 1813 he wrote to the government on behalf of a Mi'kmaq named Pierre Bernard, requesting for him a piece of land. The reply from the Secretary of the Council was very encouraging. A few years later, in 1818, he again wrote a successful letter of recommendation supporting Andrew James Meuse as chief of the local Mi'kmaq tribe. He noted in a letter to his bishop in 1815, the desperate state which prevailed among the local Mi'kmaq, describing them "like sheep without a shepherd" and noting, with regret, the advantage which other people often took of them. 

Sigogne continued his work as parish priest at St Mary's Bay until his death on 9 November 1844 in the sacristy of his church at Pointe-de-l'Église, Nova Scotia. He was 81 years old. A monument in his honour was erected at Clare.

Notes

(3) Guy Frégault, "La déportation des Acadiens", Revue d'Histoire de l'Amérique française 8/3 (1954) pp. 349–350. Voir aussi Thomas B. Akins, "Extract from the minutes of the Proceedings of the Lords Commissioners of Trade and Plantations, December 3d, 1762.", Public Documents of the Province of Nova Scotia, Halifax, N.S., Charles Annand, 1869, pp. 337–338.(reprendre à 3)
(4) Petit village à la Baie Sainte-Marie dans le comté de Digby, Nouvelle-Écosse.(reprendre à 4)
(5) Placide P. Gaudet, "La Pointe-à-Major, berceau de la colonie de Clare", L'Évangéline (18 juin 1891).(reprendre à 5)
(6) Joan Bourque Campbell, L'Histoire de la paroisse de Sainte-Anne-du-Ruisseau (Eel Brook), Yarmouth, Éditions Lescarbot, 1985, p. 13 ; et Clarence J. d'Entremont, Histoire de Wedgeport, N.-É., s.é., 1967, p. 6.(reprendre à 6)
Aller à la bibliographie.

Bibliography
Gérald C. Boudreau. Le père Sigogne et les Acadiens du sud-ouest de la Nouvelle-Écosse. Monograph published by Éditions Bellarmin, St-Laurent (Quebec), May 1992, 230pp.

External links 
 Biography at the Dictionary of Canadian Biography Online
 Biography at the Canadian Encyclopedia
 Sigogne and the Acadians

See also 
History of the Acadians

19th-century Canadian Roman Catholic priests
1763 births
1844 deaths
18th-century French Roman Catholic priests